Matt Coates (born July 15, 1991) is a Canadian football wide receiver. He played college football at the New Mexico Military Institute. He also played junior football for the Hamilton Hurricanes of the Canadian Junior Football League (CJFL).

Early years
Coates played high school football at Markham District High School in Markham, Ontario and was named a two-time Team M.V.P. The Marauders won the Metro Bowl his senior year. He received interest from several universities but decided to become an electrician like his father. He played touch football with the Markham Mustangs in a recreational league while working on his apprenticeship in his father's business.

Junior football
Coates played for the Hamilton Hurricanes of the CJFL after receiving an offer from the Hurricanes' coach Jay Hayes, who he played flag football with, to play for them. He returned to the Hurricanes after spending one season playing college football in 2012. He recorded 630 yards on 36 receptions for the Hurricanes and set a new OFC record with 13 touchdowns in 2013. He was also named a CJFL All-Canadian in 2013.

College career
Coates played for the New Mexico Military Institute Broncos in 2012.

Professional career
Coates was signed to the Hamilton Tiger-Cats's practice roster in September 2013. He later signed with the Tiger-Cats on January 29, 2014. He made his CFL debut on June 29, 2014 against the Saskatchewan Roughriders. Coates played in all eighteen regular season games and both playoff games, including the 102nd Grey Cup, for the Tiger-Cats in 2014.

References

External links
Hamilton Tiger-Cats bio

Living people
1991 births
Canadian football wide receivers
American football wide receivers
Canadian players of American football
Canadian Junior Football League players
New Mexico Military Institute Broncos football players
Hamilton Tiger-Cats players
Winnipeg Blue Bombers players
Players of Canadian football from Ontario
Sportspeople from Markham, Ontario